U.S. Route 41 (US 41) in the state of Indiana is a north–south US Highway that is parallel to the Illinois state line. It enters the state south of Evansville as a four-lane divided highway passing around Vincennes and traveling north to Terre Haute. In Terre Haute, it is known as 3rd Street. North of Terre Haute, it hooks east and becomes a two-lane surface road. Those wanting to stay on a four-lane divided highway can use State Road 63 to the west. It passes through Rockville, Veedersburg, and Attica before returning to a four-lane divided highway when SR 63 terminates in Warren County. It remains a four-lane divided highway until Lake County, where it becomes a main road known as Indianapolis Boulevard. It overlaps US 12 and US 20 in Hammond and exits Indiana into the South Side of Chicago.

Route description
US Route 41 is a largely rural road in western Indiana. It begins by crossing the Ohio River using the Bi-State Vietnam Gold Star Bridges, commonly known as "The Twin Bridges", from Henderson, Kentucky, into Evansville. Through Evansville, US 41 is again a standard arterial roadway with traffic lights and urban congestion. North of Evansville, the road becomes a rural four-lane  highway. The highway reaches Interstate 64, then has three interchanges as it passes Princeton, including one dedicated to traffic coming into and out of Toyota Motor Manufacturing Indiana, ending with SR 64 on Princeton's west side addition as it heads north towards Vincennes.

South of Vincennes, US 41 turns into an Interstate-standard freeway and bypasses the east side of Vincennes with interchanges and grade separations. In the middle of this bypass there is a three-level stack interchange with US 50 and US 150 eastbound, headed for Washington, Indiana; Cincinnati, Ohio; and Louisville, Kentucky.  US 50 splits to the west in the city, heading for Lawrenceville, Illinois, and St. Louis, Missouri, while US 41 and US 150 continue north.

North of Vincennes, the expressway turns into a four-lane divided highway, a relatively older  highway coated with asphalt and a narrow median. US 41 and US 150 pass through Sullivan before entering Terre Haute. US 150 leaves the concurrency in the south end of the city, headed west towards Danville and Moline, Illinois, while US 41 continues north through Terre Haute. Through town, US 41 is an urban arterial road with traffic lights. It approaches an interchange with Interstate 70, then passes by Honey Creek Mall and Indiana State University.

North of Terre Haute, SR 63 splits to the northwest as an Interstate-standard four-lane highway towards Clinton. US 41 heads northeast as a rural two-lane US Highway, passing through the communities of Rockville and Bloomingdale. The road reaches Interstate 74 at Veedersburg, where it briefly divides into a four-lane highway. US 41 again reduces to a two-lane highway and continues north, going past Rob Roy and Attica. Past Attica, US 41 turns northwest and rejoins the four-lane highway near Kramer at the northern terminus of SR 63.

US 41 continues northbound as a divided highway with a few crossovers at SR 26, SR 352 at Boswell, and SR 18. Past SR 63, US 41 has an interchange with US 52 eastbound, which heads southeast towards Lafayette and Indianapolis as a four-lane divided rural highway. US 52 westbound joins with US 41 heading north towards Kentland In 2008, a wind farm was built next to the highway near Earl Park. In Kentland, the road junctions with US 24. US 52 westbound leaves the concurrency here with US 24, heading for Watseka, Kankakee, and Peoria, all in Illinois, while US 24 east heads to Logansport and Huntington. US 41 becomes a four-lane divided US highway past this junction. It is relatively an older divided highway with a narrow median. This highway used to be a two-lane route. One side of the highway is rolling and wavy, while the other half of the highway is built flat and to more modern standards. This portion of the route is mainly asphalt. According to the Indiana Department of Transportation (INDOT), the twinning of US 41 in Indiana was begun in 1951, with construction progressing from south to north.

Up until the mid-1990s, many older styled bridges existed on the route, including a 1930s-era truss bridge across the Kankakee River in Schneider and some  concrete bridges at the railroad overpass near Morocco and the Iroquois River bridge. All of these bridges have since been updated to INDOT's latest standards using concrete latex overlays and new concrete bridge decks.

Traffic volumes on this section of highway are relatively low and many intersections contain 1940s- and 1950s-era former gas stations, diners, and businesses associated with the highway before I-65 was built in the early 1960s. Many of these businesses have been converted to new uses, such as used car dealerships and offices, while some have been abandoned. US 41 is sometimes considered an alternate to Interstate 65 due to its low traffic volumes.

From Kentland, US 41 passes through the towns and villages of Ade, Enos, Lake Village, and Schneider, before entering Cedar Lake. Once in Cedar Lake, US 41 becomes an undivided four-lane arterial road. The road passes through the bedroom communities of St. John, Schererville, and Highland. Entering the urban core of Northwest Indiana, the route goes through Hammond, briefly overlapping I-80/I-94/US 6.  In Whiting, the highway joins US 12/US 20 before exiting Indiana and entering Illinois in Chicago.

History

The alignment was designated as SR 10, until it was rerouted as US 41 on October 1, 1926.

Major junctions

See also

U.S. Route 31 in Indiana
Indiana State Road 241
Indiana State Road 441
Indiana State Road 641

References

External links

 Indiana Highway Ends

Expressways in the United States
41
 Indiana
Transportation in Vanderburgh County, Indiana
Transportation in Gibson County, Indiana
Transportation in Knox County, Indiana
Transportation in Sullivan County, Indiana
Transportation in Vigo County, Indiana
Transportation in Parke County, Indiana
Transportation in Fountain County, Indiana
Transportation in Warren County, Indiana
Transportation in Benton County, Indiana
Transportation in Newton County, Indiana
Transportation in Lake County, Indiana
1926 establishments in Indiana